Sonar Tori (alternatively spelt Sonar Tari) is a collection of Bengali poetry by poet Rabindranath Tagore. The collection has more than forty poems and was first published in 1894. Sonar Tori is considered to be one of the most celebrated literary works of Tagore.

Theme 
In this poetry collection, the poet shows his thirst and quest for beauty, and detaching himself from the world of humanity.

Publication 
At a Kuthibari (house) at Shilaidaha Tagore stayed intermittently between 1891 and 1901. Many poems of this collection were written during his stay at this place. The poems of this collection were written between March 1892 and December 1893. The book was first published in 1894.

References

External links 
  (online reading and download option in different formats)
 Sonar Tari at TagoreWeb

1894 poetry books
Bengali poetry
Poetry collections by Rabindranath Tagore